Antoine Rozner (born 12 February 1993) is a French professional golfer who plays on the European Tour. He has won three times on the tour, including wins at the Golf in Dubai Championship in December 2020 and the Commercial Bank Qatar Masters in March 2021. He has also won twice on the second-tier Challenge Tour.

Amateur career
Rozner attended University of Missouri–Kansas City from 2012 to 2016, winning six times. He played in the 2016 NCAA Division I Men's Golf Championship finishing in a tie for 8th place in the individual competition. He represented Europe in the 2016 Arnold Palmer Cup, winning all his four matches and represented France in the 2016 Eisenhower Trophy.

Professional career
Rozner turned professional after the 2016 Eisenhower Trophy. At the end of 2016, he was joint winner of the Alps Tour Q-school to gain a place on the tour for 2017. He had a successful season finishing runner-up twice. Together with three other top-5 finishes he finished third in the Order of Merit to gain a place on the Challenge Tour for 2018.

Rozner played in 22 tournaments on the 2018 Challenge Tour, making the cut 14 times. He was a joint runner-up in the Open de Portugal behind Dimitrios Papadatos and tied for fourth in the Le Vaudreuil Golf Challenge, finishing the season 45th in the Order of Merit.

Rozner played in two events in the early part of the 2019 Pro Golf Tour season, finishing runner-up on each occasion. In May, he won two tournaments on the Challenge Tour, the Challenge de España and the Prague Golf Challenge to lead the Order of Merit. He finished the season 8th in the Order of Merit to earn a place on the 2020 European Tour.

In December 2020, Rozner won the Golf in Dubai Championship on the Fire Course at the Jumeirah Golf Estates. He shot a final round 64 to overtake 54-hole leader Andy Sullivan.

In March 2021, Rozner holed a 60-foot birdie putt on the last hole at the Commercial Bank Qatar Masters to win by one shot for his second European Tour victory.

In December 2022, Rozner won the AfrAsia Bank Mauritius Open by five shots to claim his third victory on the European Tour.

Personal life
Rozner's older brother Olivier is also a professional golfer. Olivier won the Adamstal Open on the 2015 Pro Golf Tour.

Amateur wins
2014 Grand Prix de Chiberta, Championnat de France - Coupe Ganay, Price's "Give 'Em Five" Invitational
2015 Desert Shootout, Championnat de France - Coupe Ganay, Mark Simpson Invitational, Price's "Give 'Em Five" Invitational
2016 Desert Shootout, WAC Championship

Source:

Professional wins (5)

European Tour wins (3)

1Co-sanctioned by the Sunshine Tour

European Tour playoff record (0–1)

Challenge Tour wins (2)

Results in major championships

CUT = missed the half-way cut

Results in World Golf Championships

1Cancelled due to COVID-19 pandemic

"T" = Tied
NT = No tournament

Team appearances
Amateur
The Spirit International Amateur Golf Championship (representing France): 2015
European Amateur Team Championship (representing France): 2015, 2016
Arnold Palmer Cup (representing Europe): 2016 (winners)
Eisenhower Trophy (representing France): 2016

Professional
Hero Cup (representing Continental Europe): 2023 (winners)

Sources:

See also
2019 Challenge Tour graduates

References

External links

French male golfers
Olympic golfers of France
Golfers at the 2020 Summer Olympics
Golfers from Paris
Kansas City Roos athletes
1993 births
Living people